Made in Chelsea: Croatia, a spin-off series of Made in Chelsea, a British structured-reality television programme which began airing on 6 August 2018, and concluded after 6 episodes on 10 September 2018. The series was confirmed on 21 May 2018 This was a stand-alone series which was not promoted as the sixteenth series. The sixteenth series followed later in the year. This is the fifth spin-off show filmed away from Chelsea following NYC in 2014, LA in 2015, South of France in 2016, and Ibiza in 2017. 

The series includes the feud between Harry and Sam T as both throw each other's relationships under the bus. It also includes Tabitha and Miles briefly getting together before it's revealed she's been seeing Sam P back in Chelsea, and the final nail in the coffin for Digby and Olivia's relationship. Following this series it was announced that Sam Prince would not be returning to the show, and that this was his final series.

Cast

Episodes

{| class="wikitable plainrowheaders" style="width:100%; background:#fff;"
|- style="color:black"
! style="background: #FECFFF;"| Series no.
! style="background: #FECFFF;"| Episode no.
! style="background: #FECFFF;"| Title
! style="background: #FECFFF;"| Original airdate
! style="background: #FECFFF;"| Duration
! style="background: #FECFFF;"| UK viewers

|}

Ratings

References

External links
 

2018 British television seasons
British reality television series
British television spin-offs
Hvar
Croatia
Television shows set in Croatia